Sir Ravinder Nath Maini  (born 17 November 1937) is an Indian-born British rheumatologist and academic who is an emeritus professor at Imperial College London. He led the Kennedy Institute of Rheumatology.

Biography
Maini was born in Ludhiana, Punjab, British India, to Sir Amar Maini, a Kenyan-born lawyer and Ugandan politician, and his wife, Sam Saheli Mehra. His younger brother is academic Yoginder Nath Tidu Maini. Ravinder completed his bachelor's degree at Sidney Sussex College, Cambridge. In the 1980s, Maini, Marc Feldmann and Fionula Brennan identified TNF alpha as a key cytokine in the process of rheumatoid arthritis.

Honours and awards
 2000: Maini was awarded the Crafoord Prize. 
 2003: Knighthood
 2003:  Albert Lasker Award for Clinical Medical Research. 
 2004 Fothergillian prize from the London Medical Society
 2004: Cameron Prize for Therapeutics of the University of Edinburgh
 2007 Elected Fellow of the Royal Society
 2008: Dr. Paul Janssen Award for Biomedical Research together with Marc Feldmann.
 2010 Ernst Schering Prize from the German Schering Foundation together with Marc Feldmann.

He is an honorary member of the British Society for Immunology.

References

External links 
Emeritus Professor Sir Ravinder Maini
Sir Ravinder Maini's biography on Faculty of 1000

1937 births
Living people
Indian rheumatologists
Academics of Imperial College London
Alumni of Sidney Sussex College, Cambridge
Indian medical educators
Knights Bachelor
British people of Indian descent
Fellows of the Academy of Medical Sciences (United Kingdom)
Recipients of the Lasker-DeBakey Clinical Medical Research Award
Fellows of the Royal Society
Foreign associates of the National Academy of Sciences
Scientists from Ludhiana
20th-century Indian medical doctors
British people of Punjabi descent
Medical doctors from Punjab, India